Louis "Dicta" Johnson (born June 29, 1887) was an American spitball pitcher in Negro league baseball and during the pre-Negro league years. He played from 1908 until 1923, mostly for the Indianapolis ABCs and the Chicago American Giants.

In 1910 and 1911, Johnson followed many of his fellow Chicago players to the St. Paul Colored Gophers team, which became the Twin Cities Gophers in 1911. There he would play with Candy Jim Taylor, William Binga, Mule Armstrong, Sherman Barton, Johnny Davis and future College Football Hall of Fame legend Bobby Marshall.

In 1913, Johnson pitched a no-hitter for the Chicago American Giants.

Johnson pitched for the 183rd Infantry Team in 1918.

In 1922 he managed the Pittsburgh Keystones, and in 1923 he managed the Toledo Tigers, acting as a player-coach for the Tigers.

References

External links
 and Baseball-Reference Black Baseball stats and Seamheads

1887 births
20th-century deaths
Year of death missing
Baseball pitchers
Chicago American Giants players
Illinois Giants players
Indianapolis ABCs players
Detroit Stars players
Pittsburgh Keystones players
St. Paul Colored Gophers players
Baseball players from Illinois
People from Elizabethtown, Illinois
French Lick Plutos players
Toledo Tigers players
Milwaukee Bears players
20th-century African-American people